Thorpe is a surname derived from the Middle English word thorp, meaning hamlet or small village. Thorpe is found as the name of many places in England.

People with this name
 Adam Thorpe (born 1956), British author 
 Adelbert Delos Thorp (1844–1919), American politician in Wisconsin
 Aidey Thorpe (born 1963), English footballer
 Alma Thorpe (born 1935), Aboriginal Australian activist and elder
 Ashley Thorpe (born 1975), Cricketer
 Benjamin Thorpe (1782–1870), English scholar of Anglo-Saxon
 Billy Thorpe (1946–2007), rock and roll musician
 Chris Thorpe (born 1970), U.S. Olympic luge athlete
 Clarence Thorpe (American football) (1909–1985), American Negro league pitcher
 David Thorpe (artist) (born 1972), English artist
 David Thorpe (footballer) (born 1948), winner of the 1968 Charles Sutton Medal
 David Thorpe (motorcyclist), 500cc Motocross World Champion in 1985, 1986 and 1989
 D. R. Thorpe, British historian and biographer
 Ethel L. M. Thorpe (1908–2001), British-Canadian nurse
 Frank Thorpe (public servant) (1885–1967), Australian senior public servant
 George Thorpe (disambiguation), several people
 Graham Thorpe (born 1969), English cricketer
 Heath Thorpe (born 2000), Australian artistic gymnast
 Ian Thorpe (born 1982), Australian swimmer
 Jeremy Thorpe (1929–2014), former UK Liberal Party leader
 Jerry Thorpe (1926–2018), American TV and film director
 Jim Thorpe (1888–1953), U.S. athlete
 Jim Thorpe (Canadian football) (1944–2020), Canadian footballer
 Jim Thorpe (golfer) (born 1949), American professional golfer
 Jimmy Thorpe (1913–1936), English professional footballer 
 Jimmy Thorpe (footballer, born 1879) (1879–1956), English professional footballer 
 Jocelyn Field Thorpe (1872–1939), British chemist
 John Thorpe (1565–1655), English architect
 John Wells-Thorpe (1928–2019), English architect
 Kay Thorpe (born 1935), romantic novelist
 Laura Thorpe (born 1987), French tennis player
 Lee Thorpe (born 1975), English footballer
 Lewis Thorpe, academic
 Lewis Thorpe (baseball) (born 1995), Australian baseball player
 Lidia Thorpe (born 1973), Australian politician 
 Marjorie Thorpe, Trinidadian academic, lecturer and former diplomat
 Mathew Thorpe (born 1938), a senior judge in the Court of Appeal of England and Wales
 Otis Thorpe (born 1962), retired American professional basketball player
 Percy Thorpe (1899–?), English footballer
 Richard Thorpe (1896–1991), American film director
 Richard Thorpe (rugby union) (born 1984), English rugby union player
 Robert Thorpe (disambiguation), several people
 Rose Hartwick Thorpe (1850–1939), American writer
 Samuel Thorp or Thorpe (1765–1838), English clockmaker
 Thomas Thorpe (c. 1569 or 1570 – 1635?), Elizabethan publisher of Shakespeare's sonnets
 Thomas Edward Thorpe (1845–1925),  British chemist
 Tom Thorpe (born 1993), English footballer
 Tommy Thorpe (1881–1953), English footballer and cricketer (where he is known as Thomas Thorpe)
 Tony Thorpe (born 1974), English footballer and manager
 William de Thorpe, 14th-century English Chief Justice
 William Thorpe, putative author of 1407 Lollard text The Testimony of William Thorpe 
 William Homan Thorpe (1902–1986), British ethologist

See also
 Thorpe (disambiguation)

English-language surnames